Constantina Mădălina Cioveie (born 19 August 1983 in Târgu Jiu, Romania) is a Romanian aerobic gymnast. She won three world championships medals (one gold, one silver, and one bronze) and three European championships medals (two gold and one silver). She also works as an aerobic gymnastics coach.

References

External links

1983 births
Living people
Sportspeople from Târgu Jiu
Romanian aerobic gymnasts
Female aerobic gymnasts
Medalists at the Aerobic Gymnastics World Championships